The First Development Cabinet is the name of the cabinet of the Indonesian government led by President Soeharto. This cabinet was announced on June 6, 1968 and served since June 10, 1968 to March 27, 1973. The composition of this cabinet is not much different from the composition of ministers in the Revised Ampera Cabinet. Shortly after the 1971 elections, on September 9, 1971, President Soeharto announced a reshuffle of the First Development Cabinet and appointed the reshuffled ministers on September 11, 1971.

The main tasks of the Development Cabinet are stipulated in MPRS Decree No. XLI/MPRS/1968 and known as Panca Krida which includes:
 Creating political and economic stability as the unnegotiable prerequisite for the success of the Five Year Development Plan and the Legislative Election.
 Organizing and executing the Five Year Development Plan.
 Holding Legislative Elections on 5 July 1971 at the latest.
 Restoring order and security to society by finishing off the leftovers of 30 September Movement and every threat, abuse, and betrayal of Pancasila and the 1945 Constitution.
 Continuing the universal reform and purge of the state apparatus at National and Regional Level.

On April 1, 1969, the implementation of First Pelita (1969–1974) began. The purpose of holding First Pelita is to improve the people's standard of living and at the same time lay the foundations for development in the next stage. While the targets are food, clothing, infrastructure improvement, public housing, expansion of employment opportunities, and spiritual welfare. The focus of First Pelita is the development of the agricultural sector in accordance with the aim of pursuing economic backwardness through the process of reforming the agricultural sector, because the majority of Indonesia's population still lives from agricultural products.

Cabinet Leader

Cabinet Members

Ministers 
The following are the ministers of the First Development Cabinet.

Official with ministerial rank 
The following are ministerial-level officials in the First Development Cabinet.

Reshuffle  
On September 9, 1971, President Soeharto made a decision to adjust and replace several Development Cabinet ministers after careful evaluation and consideration. The replacement of several ministers does not imply the formation of a cabinet, but solely in order to further enhance the implementation of development in the Panca Krida Development Cabinet.

Given another assignment 
The ministers who were replaced were given new obligations according to their respective capabilities. Some are members of the Supreme Advisory Council and some are assigned abroad. This replacement will actually improve the implementation of the Development Cabinet's tasks. So most of the ministers who were appointed were those who from the beginning took part in carrying out Government policies, particularly in the economic and development fields. Thus, it is hoped that the continuity of the policies outlined for the smooth implementation of the Development Cabinet's duties will be more guaranteed.

Reshuffle Cabinet appointments 
The inauguration was held on Saturday, September 11, 1971.

Notes

References

Book

Newspapers and others 

New Order (Indonesia)
Cabinets of Indonesia
1968 establishments in Indonesia
1973 disestablishments in Indonesia
Cabinets established in 1968
Cabinets disestablished in 1973
Suharto